Tula (also Romanized as Ţūlā and Ţowlā; also known as Shahrak-e Ţūlā and Tāola) is a village in Howmeh Rural District, in the Central District of Qeshm County, Hormozgan Province, Iran. At the 2006 census, its population was 1,742, in 457 families.

References 

Populated places in Qeshm County